Sefid Choqa (also Romanized as Sefīd Choqā and Sefīd Cheqā; also known as Sefīd Chia) is a village in Hojr Rural District, in the Central District of Sahneh County, Kermanshah Province, Iran. At the 2006 census, its population was 116, in 31 families.

References 

Populated places in Sahneh County